Étagnac is a commune in the department of Charente, region of Nouvelle-Aquitaine, southwestern France.

Population

See also
 Rochechouart impact structure
Communes of the Charente department

References

Communes of Charente